Kenny Daniel (born June 1, 1960) is a former American football defensive back. He played for the New York Giants in 1984 and for the Indianapolis Colts from 1986 to 1987.

References

1960 births
Living people
American football defensive backs
San Jose State Spartans football players
Oakland Invaders players
New York Giants players
Indianapolis Colts players